Prosper Avor is a Ghanaian professional footballer. He plays for Liberty Professionals in the Ghana Premier League. Formerly played at Hearts of Lion. He plays as a centre back or defensive midfielder.

Career 
The centre-back started his career in 2006 with Ghanaian divisional side Super Rangers FC. He played one year for the  team Super Rangers FC, before moved in the spring 2009 to Ghana Premier League club Heart of Lions. After 5 and a half year at Lions, was on 30 January 2015 signed by Ghana Division One League club Okyeman Planners F.C.

At the end of the 2016 season, a host of clubs including Accra Hearts of Oak and Liberty Professionals had chased for his signature but it was Liberty Professionals that got him.

He went on trails at South African club Witbank Spurs F.C. in November 2017 but the deal fell out due financial agreement.

Heart of Lions
In the MTN FA Cup 2013, he scored the open goal in the 34th minutes, helping his side to a 2–0 win over Mighty Jets, on 6 April at Kpandu.

Liberty Professionals
He has already scored 3 goals for the Liberty Professionals in the Ghana Premier League 2016–17.

Personal Achievement
2016-2017, Ghana Premier League, First Round winner of the Most Valuable Player Award.

References

External links
  Prosper Avor @ WORLD FOOTBALL

Ghanaian footballers
1992 births
Living people
Liberty Professionals F.C. players
Ghana Premier League players
Association football defenders
Karela United FC players